Tricorynus similis is a species of beetle in the family Ptinidae. It is found in North America.

References

Further reading

 
 
 

Bostrichoidea
Articles created by Qbugbot
Beetles described in 1878